This is a list of characters appearing in the “Winnie-the-Pooh” books and the Disney adaptations of the series.

Main

Winnie-the-Pooh 

Winnie-the-Pooh, or Pooh for short, is an anthropomorphic, soft-voiced, cuddly, loveable and quiet bear and the main protagonist. Despite being naïve and slow-witted, he is a friendly, thoughtful and sometimes insightful character who is always willing to help his friends and try his best. A prime motivation is his love for honey, which quite often leads to trouble.

In the books, Pooh is a talented poet, and the stories are frequently punctuated by his poems and "hums". He is humble about his slow-wittedness, but comfortable with his creative gifts.

In the Disney adaptations, in which the character's name lacks hyphens, Pooh has a soft voice, wears a red shirt and his catchphrases are "Oh, bother!" and "Think, think, think". He has been voiced by Sterling Holloway (1965–1977), Hal Smith (1981–1986), and Jim Cummings (1988–present). Cummings reprised his role for the Christopher Robin film.

Christopher Robin

The only human character in the story books, he has a "cheerful" and compassionate personality and is someone whom Pooh and the others look up to. Despite being a child, he is much wiser and more mature than many of the other characters. Pooh considers both Christopher Robin and Piglet to be his best friends.

Christopher Robin matures considerably over the course of the books. Some chapters in The House at Pooh Corner cover Christopher Robin beginning to go to school and his increasing book-learning. In the final chapter, Christopher Robin leaves his stuffed animals behind and asks Pooh to understand and to always remember him.

In the Disney adaptations, he is 10 years old and only goes to day school.  As in the books, he is best friends with both Piglet and Pooh, and he and Pooh always do nothing together. He has a little sister named Darby, a 6-year-old girl who hosts My Friends Tigger & Pooh, but he only appeared in the show twice, due to him going off to college. 

Christopher Robin is voiced by Bruce Reitherman (1965–1966), Robie Lester (A Happy Birthday Party with Winnie the Pooh), Jon Walmsley (1967–1968), Ginny Tyler (Disneyland Records), Timothy Turner (1974), Kim Christianson (1983), Tim Hoskins (1988–1991), Edan Gross (1991), Brady Bluhm (1997–1999), Tom Attenborough (2000), Tom Wheatley (2003), William Green (2002), Paul Tiesler (2001–2003), Struan Erlenborn (2007–2010), Jack Boulter (2011), and Oliver Bell (2017). Christopher Robin starred in his own film, portrayed by Ewan McGregor as an adult and Orton O'Brien a child (2018).

Piglet

Piglet is Pooh's best friend besides Christopher Robin. In the books, he often takes his lead from Pooh unless overcome by fear which occurs more often than not. But increasingly through the stories he shows himself to be very brave when faced with a crisis and given sufficient encouragement (usually by Pooh). He is fond of "haycorns".

In the Disney series he is kind, gentle and ordinarily quite shy, but with Pooh by his side, he often overcomes his fears. His catchphrase is "Oh, d-d-dear!". Piglet lives in a beech tree that he likes to keep neat and tidy, and can sing very well. He has been voiced by John Fiedler (1968–2005), Robie Lester (Disneyland Records), Phil Baron (1983–1986), Travis Oates (2005–present), and in the Christopher Robin film, he was voiced by Nick Mohammed.

Tigger

Tigger is Pooh's happy, less-than-responsible and a sometimes troublemaking tiger friend. He bounces around, especially bouncing on others. He is full of energy, outgoing, and likes to have fun and is so overconfident that he thinks that any task is "what tiggers do best". He becomes Roo's best friend and later Lumpy's when Roo and Lumpy become best friends.

In the Disney films Tigger commonly mispronounces words, like "ridickerus" (ridiculous) and often causes chaos rather than good. However, Tigger is also shown to be tough, fearless, optimistic and resourceful; he is shown to be protective of Roo when Kanga's not around, as seen in "Too Smart For Strangers". His main catchphrase is "Hoo Hoo Hoo Hoo!" when he is happy. He has been voiced by Paul Winchell (1968–1999), Sam Edwards (Disneyland Records), Will Ryan (1983–1986), and Jim Cummings (1989–present). Cummings reprised his role for the Christopher Robin film.

He often uses nicknames for the other characters, calling Pooh "Pooh Boy", "Fluff Boy" and "Buddy Bear", Rabbit "Ol' Long Ears", "Fluffface" and "Bunny Boy", Eeyore "Donkey Boy" (with Tigger pronouncing it as 'dunkey'), Piglet "Piglet Ole Pal" (pronouncing it as "Piggle-it"), Roo "Roo Boy", and Kanga "Mrs. Kanga Ma’am". In The Tigger Movie and The Book of Pooh, Tigger also sometimes calls Owl "Beak Lips" and "Buddy Bird".

In The Tigger Movie and the Book of Pooh episode, "The Wood Without Pooh", it is implied that Tigger is somewhat jealous of Pooh's role as the protagonist.

Rabbit

Rabbit is one of the characters not based on a toy once owned by Christopher Robin Milne. He was said to be based on a real rabbit where they lived. He is friendly, yet capable of being impatient and irritable. He fancies himself the smartest animal in the Hundred Acre Wood, since he is not scatterbrained like Tigger. He insists on doing things his way and is obsessed with rules, planning and order. He often bosses others around, but deep down, he cares a lot about his friends.

In the Walt Disney films, he takes pride in his garden and dislikes it when the other characters disrupt it. Disney's Rabbit likes gardening, cleaning, and magic tricks.

Voiced in the Disney films by Junius Matthews (1965–1977), Robie Lester (A Happy Birthday Party with Winnie the Pooh), Dallas McKennon (Disneyland Records), Ray Erlenborn (1983), Will Ryan (1983–1986), Ken Sansom (1988–2010), Tom Kenny (2011–present), and in the Christopher Robin film, he was voiced by Peter Capaldi.

Eeyore 

Eeyore is Pooh's ever-glum, pessimistic and sarcastic donkey friend who has trouble keeping his tail attached to his bottom, since the nail keeps falling out. Eeyore has a house made of sticks, which falls apart (many times in the Disney films as a running gag) and has to be rebuilt.

In the Disney cartoons, Eeyore is slow-talking and more cautious than some of the other animals, and is often reluctant to go along with their actions, but usually does not bother trying to oppose anyone because he believes it to be futile to try. His catchphrase is "Thanks for noticing" as indicated to himself. He has been voiced by Ralph Wright (1966–1983), Thurl Ravenscroft (Disneyland Records), Ron Feinberg (1981), Ron Gans (1983–1986), Peter Cullen (1988–present), Bud Luckey (2011 film), and in the Christopher Robin film, he was voiced by Brad Garrett.

Kanga 

Kanga is a female kangaroo and the doting mother of Roo. The two live in a house near the Sandy Pit in the northwestern part of the forest. Kanga is the only female character to appear in the books and in most Winnie-the-Pooh media. She was based on a stuffed toy that belonged to Christopher Robin Milne.

Kanga is kind-hearted, calm, patient and docile. She likes to keep things clean and organized, and offers motherly advice and food to anyone who asks her. She is protective over Roo, almost obsessively, and treats him with kind words and gentle discipline. She also has a sense of humor, as revealed in chapter seven of Winnie-the-Pooh when Rabbit connives to kidnap Roo, leaving Piglet in his place; Kanga pretends not to notice that Piglet is not Roo and proceeds to give him Roo's usual bath, much to Piglet's dismay. These events were adapted into animated form in a scene from Piglet's Big Movie (2003).

In the Disney adaptations, Kanga's personality is unchanged (though she is much more sensible and down to earth, and gives Roo some level of independence), but she plays a slightly lesser role and does not appear nearly as often as Roo does. Additionally, Tigger lives in his own house instead of with Kanga (although he is seen frequently visiting her house). Kanga also has a love for carrots. Kanga has never had a movie where she's the lead or co-lead.

She has been voiced by Barbara Luddy (1966–1977), Robie Lester (Disneyland Records), Julie McWhirter (1983), Patricia Parris (1988–1992), Tress MacNeille (1994–2000, 2005–2006, 2015—present), Kath Soucie (2000–2010), Kristen Anderson-Lopez (2011 film), and in the film Christopher Robin (2018), she was voiced by Sophie Okonedo.

Roo

Roo is Kanga's cheerful, playful, energetic son, who moved to the Hundred Acre Wood with her. His best friends are Tigger and a young Heffalump named Lumpy who loves to play with him. Roo is the youngest of the main characters.

When Kanga and Roo first come to the forest in chapter seven of Winnie-the-Pooh, everyone thinks Kanga is a fierce animal, but discover this to be untrue and become friends with her. In the books, when Tigger comes to the forest, she welcomes him into her home, attempts to find him food he likes and allows him to live with her and Roo. After this, Kanga treats him much the way she does her own son.

Voiced in the Disney films by Clint Howard (1966–1977), Robie Lester (Disneyland Records), Dori Whitaker (1974), Dick Billingsley (1983), Kim Christianson (1983–1986), Nicholas Melody (1988–1990), Nikita Hopkins (1998–2005), Jimmy Bennett (2004–2005), Max Burkholder (2007–2010), Wyatt Hall (2011), Aidan McGraw (2019) and in the Christopher Robin film, he was voiced by Sara Sheen.

Owl
Owl is the stuffy and talkative eldest main character who presents himself as a mentor and teacher to the others. He was not based on a stuffed toy, so in the illustrations he looks more like a live animal.

Owl and most of his friends believe that he is the most intelligent animal in the wood, but he is really quite scatterbrained. He often rambles on into long-winded speeches, especially about his family, and uses words that his friends do not understand. Owl likes to present himself as very knowledgeable, and is perceived by the other animals as such, but like most of the other characters, he does not spell very well; he even spells his own name "Wol". When Pooh comes to him for help in writing a birthday greeting for Eeyore, Owl tells Pooh that he is writing, "A very happy birthday with love from Pooh", but in fact writes "HIPY PAPY BTHUTHDTH THUTHDA BTHUTHDY". Pooh, who cannot read, goes on his way happy with Owl's work and is grateful for his help.  When Rabbit (who is quite literate) comes to Owl to discuss a notice that Christopher Robin has left, Owl cannot read the notice. But rather than admit this, Owl anxiously bluffs his way through the conversation until he finally tricks Rabbit into reading the notice out loud, at which point Owl resumes his wise demeanor as if he had known all along what it had said.

In the books, Owl has a superior but kindly manner towards the others. He can be cross and easily annoyed, especially when his friends ignore or interrupt his long-winded speeches. He sometimes wears reading glasses, and uses his talons for hands, as opposed to his wings in the Disney version. He lives in a tree known as The Chestnuts, described as an "old world residence of great charm". The house is blown down by a storm in the eighth chapter of The House at Pooh Corner. Eeyore eventually discovers what he believes is the perfect new house for Owl, apparently without noticing that it is actually Piglet's house. Nonetheless, Piglet offers the house to Owl, who calls his new home "The Wolery".

In the Disney adaptations, Owl is much more jovial and friendly. He enjoys telling stories about his relatives, including his cousin, Dexter, whenever something reminds him of one, but many of his stories are pointless or absurd. His house blows down and he moves into Piglet's house in Winnie the Pooh and the Blustery Day, but these events are disregarded from Winnie the Pooh and a Day for Eeyore onward. In Welcome to Pooh Corner, Owl always wears glasses (and often a cap and goggles when flying) and loves to cook. He does not appear in My Friends Tigger & Pooh.

He has been voiced by Hal Smith (1966–1994), Junius Matthews (A Happy Birthday Party with Winnie the Pooh), Sam Edwards (Disneyland Records), Andre Stojka (1997–2007), Craig Ferguson (2011 film), and in the Christopher Robin film, he was voiced by Toby Jones.

Minor in the books

Bees
A swarm of honeybees makes their debut in the very first chapter. They live in the hive where Pooh tries to get his honey. They frequently appear in virtually every version of the Disney adaptations. There appear to be several different beehives in the Hundred Acre Wood. Whenever Pooh and his friends encounter the bees, trouble usually occurs with the bees going after them.

Rabbit's friends and relations
Many small mammals and insects in the books are collectively known as Rabbit's Friends and Relations. They do not generally do much or have much character development, and only a few of them are named.
 Alexander Beetle is briefly mentioned on page 119 of Winnie-the-Pooh, and he appears to have become upset and hidden himself in a crack for two days, then went to live with his aunt. He is also the subject of a poem in Now We Are Six.
 Small (short for Very Small Beetle) is the subject of a search that Rabbit organizes to find him. Making his debut in My Friends Tigger & Pooh, he is the first new Milne character to appear in the Disney adaptations since the debut of Tigger in Winnie the Pooh and the Blustery Day.
 Henry Rush is a beetle. He had a brief mention in The House at Pooh Corner, and has been expanded in Return to the Hundred Acre Wood. He attended the Spelling Bee, kept score at the cricket game, and danced at the Harvest Festival.
 Late and Early are two friends mentioned briefly at the end of The House at Pooh Corner and expanded in Return to the Hundred Acre Wood. They attended Christopher Robin's coming home party and received sugar mice. They also attended the Spelling Bee. Although it is never mentioned what species they are, illustrations point to them being mice.
 Smallest-of-All, or S. of A. for short, is mentioned near the end of The House at Pooh Corner and near the beginning of Return to the Hundred Acre Wood. He has a tendency to be unsure of what he sees. His species is never revealed.
 Rabbit's family appears alongside Rabbit in the books. Many relatives appear in The New Adventures of Winnie the Pooh episode "Party Poohper" and he occasionally mentions them at other times in the Disney adaptations.

Heffalumps

Heffalumps are elephant-like creatures first mentioned in the fifth chapter of the first book and in the third chapter of the second. In the books, Piglet twice has a run-in with a Heffalump that is only a figment of his imagination. The Disney version establishes them as real creatures. Like Pooh imagined in the books, Heffalumps are fond of honey and like to take it for themselves. There have been several real Heffalump characters in the Disney version. Some Heffalumps are villainous creatures and some are genuinely good. Lumpy the heffalump is Roo's good friend, appearing in Pooh's Heffalump Movie and My Friends Tigger & Pooh.

Woozles

A Woozle is a weasel-like creature imagined by the characters in the third and ninth chapters of Winnie-the-Pooh. No Woozles actually appear in A. A. Milne's original stories, but the book depicts them as living in cold, snowy places. They are first mentioned when Pooh and Piglet attempt to capture one, which they assume made the tracks in the snow going around a larch spinney. The more they follow them, the more sets of tracks they find, but Christopher Robin shows them that the tracks around the spinney are their own.

Woozles appear in the song "Heffalumps and Woozles" in Winnie the Pooh and the Blustery Day, which establishes their fondness for stealing honey and their association with Heffalumps. In The New Adventures of Winnie the Pooh, Woozles are real creatures. A Woozle named Stan and his sidekick Heff the Heffalump are recurring villains. They once recruited a giant Woozle named Wooster (also voiced by Jim Cummings) who turned against them when Pooh and his friends taught him the value of friendship. Woozles do not appear in the Disney adaptations nearly as often as Heffalumps do and, unlike Heffalumps, always attempt to act as villains, with Wooster being the only one to change his mind on this.

Woozle Hill on Galindez Island was named for the creatures.

Jagulars
Jagulars are imagined jaguar-like fierce creatures that are only mentioned in the fourth chapter of The House at Pooh Corner, in which Pooh and Piglet mistake Tigger for one. According to Pooh, they always yell "Help" (or "Halloo" in Winnie the Pooh and Tigger Too!), hang in trees, and drop on you when you look up. Jagulars have yet to actually appear in any Disney adaptations. Their most prominent role to date is in The New Adventures of Winnie the Pooh where they are mentioned more often and are the main antagonists in a couple of episodes.

Backson
The Backson is a creature imagined by the characters after misunderstanding Christopher Robin's note, which meant he would be "back soon" from school. He is mentioned but not seen in The House at Pooh Corner as "the Spotted or Herbaceous Backson". He is the main antagonist in Winnie the Pooh where the animals think he has captured Christopher Robin. Owl describes him as a large, ugly, creepy, mean and scary purple and blue creature who ruins or destroys many everyday items, such as books, socks and crayons. Pooh and his friends build a trap to try to capture him (a pit with a trail of books, socks, dishes, toys and other items leading to it), but Christopher Robin reveals that he was never captured, just away at school. At the end of the film, the Backson turns out to be real, but he is a kind and helpful creature who wants to return people's things to them. However, the trap does capture him, as he picks up all the items, intending to return them to their owners, and then falls into the pit.

Backson is voiced by Huell Howser.

Uncle Robert
Uncle Robert was Owl's uncle, whose portrait hangs on Owl's wall. He is mentioned in the eighth chapter of The House at Pooh Corner, but never actually appears. His portrait appears in Winnie the Pooh and a Day for Eeyore when Owl says Uncle Robert celebrated his 103rd birthday, despite claiming to be 97. Return to the Hundred Acre Wood reveals that Uncle Robert is dead, but Owl keeps his ashes in a vase and attempts to write his biography.

Characters in Return to the Hundred Acre Wood
Lottie is an otter and the only new major character in Return to the Hundred Acre Wood. Lottie is a "feisty" character who is also good at cricket and insists on proper etiquette. She wears a pearl necklace and can play the mouth organ, but is a little snide and snobby in her remarks. She makes her home in a wooden trunk filled with water that she calls Fortitude Hall. According to Benedictus, "Lottie the Otter truly embodies Winnie-the-Pooh's values of friendship and adventure seen throughout Milne's work, thus making the perfect companion for everyone's favourite bear."
Grandad Buck is Rabbit's grandfather. He wears glasses and is described as "Very Ancient and the Head of the Rabbit Family". He does not entirely approve of Rabbit, but gives him advice anyway. He knew Owl's late Uncle Robert, who sent him letters.
A Thesaurus is what Piglet imagines to be a large reptilian creature in a similar way to how the characters imagined Heffalumps and other creatures in the original books. Even after Piglet learns what the word "thesaurus" means, he still imagines it to be an animal.

Characters in Winnie-the-Pooh: The Best Bear in All the World

Penguin
Brian Sibley introduced Penguin in the story "Winter".

Major created by Disney

The Narrator
The storyteller who speaks off-screen. Sometimes the characters, who are aware that they are in a book, speak with him while facing him. They sometimes affectionately call him "Mr. Narrator". He sometimes uses his position to help the characters, since he can manipulate the book and pages. Some stories, such as Pooh's Grand Adventure: The Search for Christopher Robin have a narrator, but omit the "book" feature, so the characters are unaware of him. Welcome to Pooh Corner is the only time when viewers actually see his face. He does not appear at all in The New Adventures of Winnie the Pooh, Piglet's Big Movie and Pooh's Heffalump Movie (in Pooh's Heffalump Movie, Pooh is the narrator). He is the only Disney-only character who returns for Winnie the Pooh. Typically, he speaks with a Southern-English accent.

Voiced by Sebastian Cabot, Laurie Main, David Warner, John Rhys-Davies, John Hurt, Roger L. Jackson, David Ogden Stiers, Michael York and John Cleese

Gopher

Gopher is a fictional gray anthropomorphic bucktoothed gopher with a habit of whistling out his sibilant consonants. He often accidentally falls into one of the many holes he makes in the forest ground by forgetting to watch where he is going. Gopher first appears in Winnie the Pooh and the Honey Tree where he says the pun "I'm not in the book", and in Winnie the Pooh and the Blustery Day with a smaller role, warning Pooh about the "Windsday". Gopher later appears as a prominent character in the TV series The New Adventures of Winnie the Pooh, and in the specials A Winnie the Pooh Thanksgiving, Winnie the Pooh: A Valentine for You and Boo to You Too! Winnie the Pooh. The latter was included as part of Pooh's Heffalump Halloween Movie, being his last appearance in animation to date. Gopher was notably absent from the 2011 film and the live-action film. After 13 years of absence, Gopher appears in Kingdom Hearts III in the 100 Acre Wood world (also previously having appeared in Kingdom Hearts II).

Voiced by Howard Morris (1965–1977), Dallas McKennon (Disneyland Records), and Michael Gough (1988–present)

Kessie
Kessie is an orphaned bluebird with a white belly. She debuted in The New Adventures of Winnie the Pooh episode "Find Her, Keep Her". Kessie is cheerful, brave and eager to prove herself. As a nestling, Rabbit adopted her after he saved her from a snowstorm and she came to live with him and nicknamed him "Rabbie". Rabbit was very protective of her and initially did not want her to fly. After she finally learned to fly, she migrated south for the winter, despite a reluctant Rabbit, but returned in "A Bird in the Hand", where she has since matured into a young adult bird. In later appearances, she has reverted to being a juvenile bird. After appearing in Seasons of Giving, Kessie was relaunched as a main character in The Book of Pooh, her first regular role, though after the series, Kessie is never seen or mentioned again.

Voiced by Laura Mooney, Amber Hood, and Stephanie D'Abruzzo.

Lumpy
Heffridge Trumpler Brompet "Lumpy" Heffalump IV is a young lavender Heffalump with a tuft of purple hair on his head, a furry bobble-tail and a British accent and is Roo's closest best friend. He lives in a part of the forest called Heffalump Hollow with his mother. He has a stuffed alligator named Alvin and enjoys a snack called rumpledoodles. Lumpy debuts in Pooh's Heffalump Movie. The characters were initially afraid of Heffalumps and set out to capture one. Likewise, Lumpy's mother told him not to leave Heffalump Hollow because of scary creatures outside of it. After Roo "captured" Lumpy, they became best friends and were not afraid of each other any more. Lumpy also features in Pooh's Heffalump Halloween Movie and My Friends Tigger & Pooh.

He is voiced by Kyle Stanger.

Mama Heffalump
Mama Heffalump is Lumpy's mother and the biggest resident of the Hundred Acre Wood. She first appears in Pooh's Heffalump Movie saving Roo from being trapped in a pile of logs, and later appears in episodes of My Friends Tigger & Pooh.

Voiced by Brenda Blethyn/Patricia Parris.

Darby

Darby is a 6-year-old feisty, imaginative and tomboyish red-headed girl who is the hostess of My Friends Tigger & Pooh and is believed to be Christopher Robin's younger sister. She is the leader of the problem-solving Super Sleuths along with Tigger, Pooh and her pet puppy Buster. They are the only four characters to appear in every episode. Darby is brave, inquisitive, clever and imaginative. Her catchphrases are "Time to slap my cap" and "Good sleuthin', everyone!" For the most part, she replaced Christopher Robin, who was away at college and rarely appears in the My Friends Tigger & Pooh, but the episode "Christopher Froggin" reveals that she is Christopher Robin's young best friend.

Voiced by Chloë Grace Moretz (US Version), Kimberlea Berg (UK Version)

Buster

Buster is Darby's beloved and curious pet puppy and sidekick in My Friends Tigger & Pooh. He is white and wears a red collar with a gold tag. He appears in every episode and is a member of the Super Sleuths. Though he often seems to be only tagging along with the group, he is often a valuable asset in their work. Buster likes to yap loudly when he is excited or on the scent of something.

Voiced by Dee Bradley Baker

Evelyn Robin 

Evelyn Robin is a major character in Disney's 2018 feature film, Christopher Robin. She is the wife of Christopher Robin and the mother of Madeline Robin. She is often worried about her husband's workaholic tendencies because it means that he spends less time with his family and other wishes her husband would be more silly and fun-loving and spend more time with her and Madeline. She discovers that Winnie the Pooh and the other stuffed animals of the Hundred Acre Woods are alive.

Evelyn Robin was portrayed by Hayley Atwell.

Madeline Robin 

Madeline Robin is a major character in Disney's 2018 feature film Christopher Robin. She is the daughter of Christopher and Evelyn Robin. Much like Christopher was at her age, Madeline is kind, friendly, and brave. Madeline is worried about her father's workaholic tendencies since it means he spends less time with Madeline. She is one of the few people besides Christopher that knows Winnie the Pooh and the rest of the Hundred Acre Wood residents are alive.

Madeline Robin was portrayed by Bronte Carmichael.

Recurring in The New Adventures of Winnie the Pooh

Birdzilla
A Dragon-like monster that appeared in the episode "Pooh Oughta Be in Pictures", it was based on Godzilla.

Bugs
A swarm of green insects who invade Rabbit's garden in several episodes of The New Adventures of Winnie the Pooh and try to eat his vegetables. They resemble caterpillars, but are much shorter and have only six limbs. The leader wears an old-fashioned bicorne and acts like an army general. They are the main antagonists in Winnie the Pooh and Christmas Too.

Christopher Robin's mother
Appearing only in The New Adventures of Winnie the Pooh and in The Book of Pooh: Stories from the Heart, Christopher Robin's mother's face is never shown. She is normally seen from behind, and when we see the front of her, she is usually seen from the chest down. She enforces the rules on her son, but is usually calm and patient with him and loves him very much. His father is never seen or mentioned. Just like her son, she has light brown hair, and she's a grandmother of Madeline Robin.

Voiced by Patricia Parris and most recently Vicki Kenderes-Eibner. The character also appears near the beginning of the live-action film Christopher Robin, portrayed by Katy Carmichael

Crows
A flock of crows appears in several episodes of The New Adventures of Winnie the Pooh trying to steal Rabbit's vegetables. There are commonly three or four of them. A bigger and more fiendish version of the crows appear only in "A Very Very Large Animal" stealing food from a picnic and eating corn in Rabbit's garden. A redesigned version of the crows appears briefly in Tigger's Honey Hunt, Springtime with Roo and  Pooh's Heffalump Movie.

Dexter
Owl's young cousin who wears glasses. He appeared in "Owl in the Family" and "The Bug Stops Here". In the former, his parents Torbet and Ophelia appear, and in the latter, he becomes friends with Roo, who is the same age as him, while Pooh babysits them. He talks in a similar manner to Owl.

Voiced by Hal Smith.

Grandfather Gopher
Gopher's grandfather who prefers to "dream" rather than "do". Gopher calls him "Grandpappy". He appears in "To Dream the Impossible Scheme" during the "Pewter Pickaxe" contest that Gopher is desperate to see him win by building an above-ground underground city. He also appears briefly in "Easy Come, Easy Gopher" and is mentioned in "Grown But Not Forgotten".

Voiced by Jim Cummings.

Papa, Mama, and Junior Heffalump
A family of Heffalumps who appeared in "There's No Camp Like Home" and "Trap as Trap Can". Piglet was afraid of Heffalumps before they met and became friends. They live in a house made of logs. Junior wants to make his father, who has many implausible allergies, proud of him.

Nasty Jack
The leader of a gang of literal wild Horses who appeared in the episode Paw and Order in the Sheriff Piglet play. He threatened to trounce Piglet. After Piglet's badge fell off, Jack was disappointed that he wasn't sheriff anymore. Piglet made him sheriff, something Jack always wanted to be. Soon, Jack threatened to trounce his former gang and they ran away. Voiced by Jim Cummings.

The Pack Rats
Three rodents (all voiced by Jim Cummings) who appear as recurring antagonists. They steal anything they can and leave a walnut in exchange, thinking it as payment. The orange Pack Rat is fat and dimwitted, the brown one is grumpy and complaining, and the gray one is their leader. They debut in "Nothing But the Tooth" where they are more like real villains, but in "The Rats Who Came to Dinner", they turn out to be misunderstood and actually help the characters. However, they always return to their urge to steal. Their third and final appearance is in "Oh, Bottle!"

Skippy
A very large sheepdog belonging to a neighbor of Christopher Robin's. He appears in "Sorry, Wrong Slusher" and "A Pooh Day Afternoon". He is a nice dog, but sometimes makes trouble for the characters. Piglet is afraid of him (as shown in "Sorry, Wrong Slusher", where he thinks Skippy is the "slusher" that Christopher Robin and the animals are afraid of). Unlike other animal characters, Skippy is not anthropomorphized.

Stan and Heff
Stan and Heff are gangster-like villains who appeared in the episodes "The Great Honey Pot Robbery" and "A Bird in the Hand". They are a Woozle and a Heffalump respectively and try to steal as much honey as they can. Stan is the smarter and more irritable of the two and does most of the scheming, while his dimwitted sidekick Heff provides the muscle. He is also afraid of mice and thinks that Roo is a giant mouse.

Voiced by Ken Sansom and Chuck McCann respectively.

Wooster
A giant woozle who only appears in "The Great Honey Pot Robbery". He is actually revealed to be a nice woozle, despite his size. Voiced by Jim Cummings.

Recurring in My Friends Tigger & Pooh

Beaver
Beaver lives in a dam near Poohsticks Bridge. He bears a strong resemblance to Gopher, who does not appear in My Friends Tigger & Pooh. Both are hard working rodents with similar appearances and personalities, although Beaver is a little more easygoing.

Snowman was appeared too in Piglet's Big Movie. 

Voiced by Jim Cummings.

Holly
Holly is one of Santa's reindeer. She and her parents Vixen and Frost appear in Super Sleuth Christmas Movie. Holly came to the forest to find Santa's lost magic bag. The characters rescue her, help her find the bag and accompany her home. When they reach the North Pole, she flies for the first time. She returns for a visit in the episode "Home For the Holly Days". She is voiced by Makaila Baumel.

Porcupine
Porcupine can play the flute and has a passion for cooking but cannot see without her glasses. She is a close friend with Turtle, who is the only character who can hug her because of her sharp quills. They were pen pals before he came to the forest.

Voiced by Tara Strong.

Possums
Twin possum siblings first appear in "Topsy Turvy Tigger", where they attempt to invite others to their birthday party through use of upside-down drawings. They later appear in "Darby's Im-possum-ible Case", in which the characters are shown meeting them for the first time. They look alike, but have opposite personalities. The boy is zippy and outgoing, while the girl is shy and flees from crowds.

Voiced by Sydney Saylor.

Raccoon
Raccoon first appears in "Darby's Lost and Found" and later makes regular appearances in the series. He is in charge of a junk/fix-it shop. He speaks a bit like a hippie, and is annoyed when Tigger refers to his "mask", which is just part of his fur.

Voiced by Rob Paulsen.

Skunk
Skunk first appears in "Skunk's Non-Scents". He is initially upset that he cannot produce a skunk's foul odor. After it is revealed why and when skunks spray, he accomplishes it, pleasing himself. In "Beaver Gets Skunked", Beaver is reluctant to accept him due to skunks' reputation, but overcomes his prejudice and they become friends.

Voiced by James Arnold Taylor.

Squirrels
Various unnamed squirrels appear frequently in the Hundred Acre Wood. They usually do not speak. They appear numerous times in My Friends Tigger & Pooh, occasionally playing a role in the plot of an episode, and Buster likes to chase them. Squirrels also appear in The Tigger Movie and Piglet's Big Movie.

Turtle
Turtle has been Porcupine's friend and pen pal since before he came to live in the forest. He lives a slow and easy life, moves slowly, and speaks with a southeastern United States accent. Turtle enjoys quiet activities like bird watching or playing checkers with his friends. Because of his shell, he is the only character who can hug Porcupine.

Voiced by Mark Hamill.

Woodpecker
Woodpecker is an absent-minded woodpecker who irritates Rabbit by pecking on his house and talks in a fast, bouncy and high-pitched voice. Although Owl does not appear in the series, Woodpecker does share some characteristics with him.

Voiced by Dee Bradley Baker.

Springs
A bouncing robot who only appears in "Tigger Gets Bounced". Rabbit built Springs to replace Tigger's bouncing. Tigger and Springs compete in a bouncing contest that ends with Springs winning, which gratefully hurts Tigger's feelings. After Beaver foolishly tries to use Springs to mash dirty water (even though Rabbit warns him that Springs isn't supposed to get wet), Springs then short circuits and becomes hostile. Tigger battles Springs while protecting others from his rampage. After Tigger and Springs disappear behind a hill, an unseen fight is heard. In the end, Tigger comes out from behind the hill, concluding that he had defeated Springs (although Springs' remains are not seen after this).

The Snowmen
A group of giant snowmen who only appear in Super Sleuth Christmas Movie. When Darby and friends come across them, they come alive. Piglet is frightened of them, but Holly explains that they are not dangerous and are going to lead them to the North Pole. The snowmen then dance and sing around them before revealing the way to the North Pole for the gang. They are not seen again afterwards.

Santa Claus
He only appears in Super Sleuth Christmas Movie. After losing his magic bag in a practice run, he is on the verge on canceling Christmas before Darby and the gang arrive to return his sack. Following the return of his magic sack, he then proceeds to deliver presents, in which Pooh and friends volunteer to help him. He agrees, allowing Piglet to sit in front of the sleigh and has Holly and Eeyore lead the sleigh. He also cheers up Tigger by giving him a new mask, having lost his old one earlier. After delivering all the presents, Santa then takes the gang back to the Hundred Acre Woods.

Voiced by Jeffrey Tambor

Other characters

Pygmy Piglets
The Pygmy Piglets only appear in "The Piglet Who Would Be King", an episode of The New Adventures of Winnie the Pooh. They are about half the height of Piglet and are all clad in white clothing. They reside in the Land of Milk and Honey, which is where Piglet and his friends go to collect more honey for Pooh. They proclaim Piglet their king and a spring from a broken Jack-in-the-box, given to Piglet as a friendship present from Pooh, is thought to be the tail of a Piglet statue with a honey fountain. When the spring is removed later, the volcano of honey erupts, but Piglet, with the assistance of the Pygmies, diverts the honey flow using two statues and is hailed as a hero.

Long John Cottontail
Long John Cottontail is Rabbit's deceased great-great uncle. He only appears in The New Adventures of Winnie the Pooh episode "Rabbit Marks the Spot". Rabbit is annoyed at Pooh, Piglet, Tigger and Gopher for digging up his garden when pretending to be pirates, so he buries a treasure chest full of rocks in the ground and tells them it was the treasure of Long John Cottontail. He gives them a map showing where it is. They find it (despite Rabbit regretting his action and trying to stop them). Rabbit admits that he buried the rocks, but Pooh, Piglet, Tigger and Gopher still believe it was Long John Cottontail, and the rocks were very useful to them. The ghost of Long John Cottontail then appears and says that the animals found his buried rocks, which scares them all away. He is confused as to why they are scared of him, ending the episode.

Babysitter
A babysitter appears in The New Adventures of Winnie the Pooh'' episode "Babysitter Blues". Christopher Robin, Pooh, Piglet and Tigger repeatedly make a mess at night when his mother is out, and the babysitter gets upset, at one point telling him that if his mother saw the mess she'd never let her babysit again. However, at the end of the episode, Christopher Robin does not make a mess and the babysitter thinks he has been swapped with someone else. When the babysitter thinks Madeline Robin doesn't make a mess.

Like Christopher Robin's mother, the Babysitter's face is not shown.

Ted, Pinky, and Vacuum Head
Three stuff animals who look like Pooh, Piglet, and Tigger, but resemble gangsters. They only appear in "How Much is That Rabbit in the Window" where they try to steal Rabbit's tag in hopes of getting someone to buy them from the toy store. The store's owner is apparently unaware that they are alive. Eventually, they succeed in stealing the tag and rip it into three pieces in hopes of getting sold. After Christopher Robin bought Rabbit, he encourages them to continue waiting and that someone will buy them one day. They then take Rabbit's advice and continue to wait to be sold.

References

 
Winnie the Pooh
Winnie the Pooh
Winnie the Pooh
Winnie the Pooh